The 1968 Copa Interamericana was the 1st. edition of the Copa Interamericana. The final was contested by Argentine club Estudiantes de la Plata (champion of 1968 Copa Libertadores) and Mexican side Deportivo Toluca (winner of 1968 CONCACAF Champions' Cup). The final was played under a two-leg format in February 1969.

In the first leg, hosted at Estadio Azteca in Mexico City, Estudiantes beat Toluca 2–1. In the second leg at Estudiantes Stadium in La Plata, Toluca was the winner by the same score. As both teams tied on points and goal difference, a playoff was held in Estadio Centenario, Montevideo, where Estudiantes defeat Toluca 3–0 and therefore the team won their first Interamericana trophy,

Qualified teams

Venues

Match details

First Leg

|valign="top" width="50%"|

Second Leg

Playoff 

|}

References

Copa Interamericana
i
i
i
i
Football in Buenos Aires Province